Mabrouk Mubarak Salim is Sudan's current State Minister in the Ministry of Transport and Roads; he was appointed to that position May 2007. He was also the founding member of the Sudanese Free Lions, an armed group composed of Rashaida. He is also the leader of the Rashaida tribe in Sudan.

References 

Living people
Year of birth missing (living people)
Place of birth missing (living people)
Government ministers of Sudan
Sudanese military personnel